Tomoplagia dejeanii is a species of tephritid or fruit flies in the genus Tomoplagia of the family Tephritidae.

Distribution
Neotropical.

References

Tephritinae
Insects described in 1830
Diptera of South America